Vsevolozhsk is a town and the administrative center of Vsevolozhsky District in Leningrad Oblast, Russia, located on the Karelian Isthmus  east of St. Petersburg. Population: 

The town's name comes from manufacturer Vsevolozhsky. In 1941–1944, the vital road connecting besieged Leningrad with the rest of Soviet Union, the Road of Life, passed through the town. Currently, a considerable part of the population of Vsevolozhsk commutes to St. Petersburg for work, which is facilitated by the wide-scale construction of apartment buildings in the town.

History
A number of villages historically existed within the current area of the town of Vsevolozhsk. In particular, the village of Ryabovo was first mentioned in 1727. From the end of the 18th century and into the 19th century, Ryabovo belonged to the family of nobles of Vsevolozhsky, after whom the town was eventually named. In 1892, a narrow-gauge railway (Irinovskaya railway), the first such line in Russia, was constructed to transport peat for St. Petersburg's heating. A number of railway stations were opened, including Berngardovka, Vsevolozhskaya, and Melnichny Ruchey. Settlements eventually developed around the stations. The whole area was a part of Shlisselburgsky Uyezd of St. Petersburg Governorate. The settlement of Vsevolozhskoye, around Vsevolozhskaya railway station, was the first settlement in Russia where street gas lamps were installed. On February 14, 1923, Shlisselburgsky Uyezd was merged into Petrogradsky Uyezd. In January 1924, the uyezd and the governorate were renamed Leningradsky.

On August 1, 1927, the uyezds were abolished and Leninsky District, with the administrative center in the settlement of Vsevolozhskoye, was established. The governorates were also abolished and the district became a part of Leningrad Okrug of Leningrad Oblast. On August 15, 1930, the okrugs were abolished as well and the districts were directly subordinated to the oblast. In May 1930, Vsevolozhskaya, Berngardovka, Ilyinsky, Maryino, and Ryabovo were all granted suburban settlement status. On August 19, 1930, Leninsky District was abolished and merged into newly established Leningradsky Prigorodny District with the administrative center in the city of Leningrad. On August 19, 1936, Leningradsky Prigorodny District was abolished and Vsevolozhsky District, with the administrative center in Vsevolozhskoye, was established. On November 27, 1938, the suburban settlements of Vsevolozhskaya, Berngardovka, Ilyinsky, Maryino, and Ryabovo were merged into the urban-type settlement of Vsevolozhsky, which became the administrative center of the district. On February 1, 1963, the urban-type settlement of Vsevolozhsky was renamed Vsevolozhsk and granted the status of town of oblast significance. In 2010, the administrative structure of Leningrad Oblast was harmonized with its municipal structure, and Vsevolozhsk became the town of district significance.

Administrative and municipal status
Within the framework of administrative divisions, Vsevolozhsk serves as the administrative center of Vsevolozhsky District. As an administrative division, it is, together with three rural localities, incorporated within Vsevolozhsky District as Vsevolozhskoye Settlement Municipal Formation. As a municipal division, Vsevolozhskoye Settlement Municipal Formation is incorporated within Vsevolozhsky Municipal District as Vsevolozhskoye Urban Settlement.

Economy

Industry
Industrial companies in Vsevolozhsk include:
Rexam PLC Beverage Can Europe and Asia, the world's leading manufacturer of beverage cans
Ford automobile assembly plant (now closed as of 2019)
Nokian Tyres tire manufacture
"MDM-print" printing house
Merloni TermoSanitari S.p.A., factory producing water-heaters
Nevsky ceramics factory
meat-processing factory
milk factory
sewing factory
furniture and construction materials plants

Transportation

In Vsevolozhsk, there are three railway stations, Berngardovka, Vsevolozhskaya, and Melnichny Ruchey. Southbound trains arrive to Finlyandsky Rail Terminal in St. Petersburg. Northbound suburban trains terminate on the stations Nevskaya Dubrovka or Ladozhskoye Ozero. Melnichny Ruchey also serves as the terminal station for suburban trains.

Vsevolozhsk is essentially a suburb of St. Petersburg and is included in the suburban road network.

Education
The town has six schools of general education, music school, art school, and two vocational schools.

Culture and recreation
The town contains eleven cultural heritage monuments of federal significance and additionally thirty-five objects classified as cultural and historical heritage of local significance. These include the Priyutino Estate and the Ryabovo Estate, as well as monuments related to the Road of Life, which was connecting Leningrad with the rest of Soviet Union during the Siege of Leningrad in 1941—1944.

Vsevolozhsk State Museum of History displays collections of local interest. The Priyutino Estate, which belonged to Alexey Olenin, the President of the Imperial Academy of Arts in the 19th century, is a museum as well.

There was an intention to make a resort in the town in the Soviet times. For that purpose a ski jump was built (now dysfunctional), but later this idea was abandoned.

Notable people
Vladimir Belousov, former ski jumper, Olympic gold medalist

References

Notes

Sources

External links
 Official website of Vsevolozhsk
 Unofficial website of Vsevolozhsk

Cities and towns in Leningrad Oblast
Karelian Isthmus
Ingria
Vsevolozhsky District
Shlisselburgsky Uyezd